Ernest Thompson Willows (1886–1926) was a pioneer Welsh aviator and airship builder. He became the first person in the United Kingdom to hold a pilots certificate for an airship when the Royal Aero Club awarded him Airship Pilots Certificate No. 1.

Willows was born in Cardiff, Wales on 11 July 1886. He was educated at Clifton College in Bristol, entering the school in 1896 and leaving  in 1901 aged 15 to train as a dentist.

He built his first airship, the Willows No. 1, in 1905 when he was 19. It was first flown  from East Moors, Cardiff on 5 August 1905, the flight lasting 85 minutes. This was soon followed by an improved Willows No. 2, in which he landed outside Cardiff City Hall on 4 June 1910. No. 2 was re-built as No. 3 which he named the City of Cardiff before he flew it from London to Paris in 1910. This was the first airship crossing of the English Channel at night and the first from England to France. The journey was not without incident, including dropping the maps over the side during the night, and problems with the envelope caused the airship to land at Corbehem near Douai at two o'clock in the morning. With the help of the local French aviator Louis Breguet the airship was repaired and arrived at Paris on 28 December 1910. He celebrated New Year's Eve with a flight around the Eiffel Tower.

Willows moved to Birmingham to build his next airship, the Willows No. 4. First flown in 1912, it was sold to the Admiralty for £1,050 and it became His Majesty's Naval Airship No. 2.

With the money from the Navy Willows established a spherical gas balloon school at Welsh Harp, Hendon near London, although this did not stop him building Willows No. 5 in 1913, a four-seater airship designed to give joy rides over London.

During the first world war Willows built kite or barrage balloons in  Cardiff. After the war he continued with ballooning but on 3 August 1926 he died in a balloon accident at Hoo Park, Kempston, Bedford instantly, together with a passenger. Three other passengers died later that day either in hospital or on their way to it making 5 deaths in all

There is a school named Willows High School built on his old airfield to remember him. There is also a pub called The Ernest Willows which is situated not far from the school.

References
 Phil Carradine (2010) Ernest Willows, Welsh Aviation Pioneer from BBC Blogs.

Bedfordshire Police account https://www.flickr.com/photos/bedfordshirepolice/7372169822/
Local newspaper https://www.britishnewspaperarchive.co.uk Search for Kempston Hoo balloon accident

People educated at Clifton College
Welsh aviators
1886 births
1926 deaths
Engineers from Cardiff
Aviators killed in aviation accidents or incidents in England
British balloonists